Eric Afful (born 1 October 1974) is a Ghanaian politician and member of the Seventh Parliament of the Fourth Republic of Ghana representing the Amenfi West Constituency in the Western Region on the ticket of the National Democratic Congress.

Early life and education 
Afful was born on 1 October 1974. He hails from Asankragwa, a town in the Western Region of Ghana. He entered Kwame Nkrumah University of Science and Technology and obtained his master's degree in Economic in 2010. He also went to University of Cape Coast, Ghana and obtained his Masters of Art in Human Resource Development in 2016.

Politics 
Afful is a member of the National Democratic Congress (NDC). In 2012, he contested for the Amenfi West seat on the ticket of the NDC sixth parliament of the fourth republic and won.

Personal life 
Afful is a Christian (Methodist). He is married (with three children).

References 

Ghanaian MPs 2017–2021
1974 births
Living people
National Democratic Congress (Ghana) politicians
Kwame Nkrumah University of Science and Technology alumni
University of Cape Coast alumni
Ghanaian MPs 2021–2025